This is a list of songs co-written by Gerry Goffin.  Goffin (1939–2014) was an American lyricist, who formed a successful songwriting partnership with his wife, Carole King.  Their first success was  "Will You Love Me Tomorrow", recorded by the Shirelles and a hit in 1961. Goffin later wrote lyrics for songs with several other composers, most notably Michael Masser.

Hits, charted songs and notable album tracks by Goffin and King

Songs by Gerry Goffin with other songwriters
In addition to King, Goffin also collaborated with other songwriters, notably Barry Mann, Jack Keller, Russ Titelman, Wes Farrell, Barry Goldberg and Michael Masser.

References



Goffin and King